Anilkumar Abhayankar, also spelt Abhyankar, (1 April 1939 – 15 March 2016) was an Indian cricketer who played first-class cricket for Vidarbha in 1959 and 1960.

His two highest scores in first-class cricket came in Vidarbha's match against Rajasthan in the Ranji Trophy in 1959-60 when, batting at number five, he scored 43 and 51. In 1960-61 he played in the Rohinton Baria Trophy representing Nagpur University.

References

External links
Anilkumar Abhayankar at Cricinfo
Anilkumar Abhyankar at CricketArchive

1939 births
2016 deaths
Indian cricketers
Vidarbha cricketers